The battles of Bohorodychne and Krasnopillia were a series of military engagements in and around the villages of Bohorodychne and , 20 kilometers north of the city of Sloviansk, between the Armed Forces of Ukraine and the Armed Forces of the Russian Federation and their allies during the offensive in eastern Ukraine as part of the battle of Donbas.

Background 

Russian forces captured Izium, a strategic city railway intersection in eastern Kharkiv Oblast. The following day in an interview for Ukrinform, Izium's Deputy Mayor Volodymyr Matsokin claimed that 80% of the city's residential buildings had been destroyed and that there was no power, heating, or water in the city due to the recent battle. Days later, during the Battle of Donbas which both Russia and Ukraine shifted their resources towards, Kreminna became the first city to fall to the Russians and separatists on 18 April. The Governor of Luhansk Oblast, Serhiy Haidai, reported that 200 civilians were killed, although casualty numbers could be much higher than reported. Ukrainian officials reported on 25 April that Russian forces were killed in a gas explosion in the Russian-occupied Kreminna City Hall. On May 27 and June 8 respectively, the last Ukrainian-controlled cities north of the Donets river, Lyman and Sviatohirsk, fell to Russian and separatist forces.

Bohorodychne and Krasnopillia are strategic due to their location south of the Donets river. Since late May, Russian forces had been able to capture all Ukrainian-held towns north of the river, although their attempts to bridge across it were foiled by Ukrainian forces. By capturing Bohorodychne and Krasnopillia, Russian and separatist forces would be able to push southwards to Sloviansk and Kramatorsk, two of the last major Ukrainian-held cities in Donetsk Oblast and a major focus in the battle of Donbas. Sloviansk Mayor Vadim Liak made calls on July 6 for residents to evacuate due to recent increases in shelling in civilian areas and the possibility of fighting occurring in the city.

Battle

Initial offensives towards the towns 
The first offensive towards Krasnopillia began on June 7, when combined Russian and LPR forces launched an offensive through the forests south of Izyum, Sviatohirsk, Synychyne, and Studenok towards the city of Sloviansk, but were stopped at Bohorodychne and Krasnopillia. On June 17, Russian and LPR forces relaunched the offensive, this time attempting a more serious breakthrough near the towns, although this was pushed back by a Ukrainian counteroffensive. On June 24, Russian artillery targeted civilian infrastructure near Bohorodychne, Krasnopillia, and surrounding villages. Russian and LPR forces attempted another breakthrough six days later on June 30, but were unsuccessful.

The next Russian offensive was on July 7, when Russian forces launched an unsuccessful attack on Bohorodychne, Krasnopillia, and the nearby village of Dolyna. That same day, Russian forces also unsuccessfully tried to bypass Barvinkove from the east with the intention of cutting the E40 Izium-Sloviansk highway, a key supply route for Ukrainian troops. A major offensive took place in Krasnopillia on July 11 and 12, with fierce shelling taking place in Dibrivne, Mazanivka, Adamivka, and Kurulka, all villages near Bohorodychne and Krasnopillia. The following day, on July 13, further Russian attacks were repelled from the northern part of Krasnopillia and Dolyna, reportedly in an attempt to further cut off the Izium-Sloviansk highway.

Russian offensives against Bohorodychne and Krasnopillia renewed unsuccessfully on July 17 and 18, with heavy shelling taking place against the towns and nearby settlements. Shelling resumed again at Bohorodychne, Krasnopillia, and surrounding villages on July 21. On July 26, Russian forces began another offensive against Krasnopillia and Bohorodychne, although were again unsuccessful. Attacks restarted again on July 31, when Russian forces began shelled Bohorodychne, Krasnopillia, and surrounding villages from the Russian-held village of Dmytrivka.

First Ukrainian counterattack 

On 5 August, presidential advisor Oleksiy Arestovych announced that the Ukrainian army had started a new counteroffensive near Izium against Russian forces and that fighting had started again in Dovhenke. The next day, there was heavy Russian bombardment in the area, including in Dovhenke; this continued on 7 August. Ukrainian forces also managed to capture the villages of Dibrivne and Dmytrivka in these counterattacks.

On August 9, Ukrainian forces recaptured Mazanivka, Russian ground offensives relaunched on August 21 south and southeast of Izium, aiming to recapture villages retaken by Ukraine in the previous weeks. Ukrainian sources reported on August 22 that Russian troops attempted to advance on Dmytrivka and Nova Dmytrivka, along with launching more attacks on Krasnopillia.

Second Ukrainian counterattack and the fall of Izyum 

On 9 September, the Russian-backed administration ordered  the "evacuation" of the population from Izium, Kupiansk and Velykyi Burluk. Later in the day Ukrainian forces reached Kupiansk, a vital transit hub at the junction of several of the main railway lines supplying Russian troops at the front. The Institute for the Study of War said it believed Kupyansk would likely fall in the next 72 hours. In response to the Ukrainian advance, Russian reserve units were sent as reinforcements to both Kupiansk and Izium.

On 10 September, Kupiansk and Izium were retaken by Ukrainian forces and Ukrainian forces were reportedly advancing towards Lyman. An advisor to the head of Kharkiv regional council, Natalia Popova, posted photos on Facebook of soldiers holding a Ukrainian flag outside Kupiansk city hall. Ukrainian security officials and police moved into the recaptured settlements to check the identities of those who stayed under Russian occupation. Later that day, Luhansk Oblast Governor Serhiy Haidai claimed that Ukrainian soldiers had advanced into the outskirts of Lysychansk, while Ukrainian partisans had reportedly managed to capture parts of Kreminna. The New York Times said "the fall of the strategically important city of Izium, in Ukraine's east, is the most devastating blow to Russia since its humiliating retreat from Kyiv.” The Russian Ministry of Defence spokesperson Igor Konashenkov responded to these developments by claiming that Russian forces in the Balakliya and Izyum area would "regroup" in the Donetsk area "in order to achieve the stated goals of the special military operation to liberate Donbas". Ukrainian President Zelenskyy said that "The Russian army in these days is demonstrating the best that it can do — showing its back. And, of course, it's a good decision for them to run." He claimed that Ukraine has recaptured  since the start of the counteroffensive.

References 

Bohorodychne and Krasnopillia
June 2022 events in Ukraine
July 2022 events in Ukraine
Eastern Ukraine offensive
Bohorodychne_and_Krasnopillia
History of Donetsk Oblast